Albert Peter Hall (2 September 1930 – 27 December 2013) was the Bishop of Woolwich from 1984 until 1996 and the first area bishop under the 1991 area scheme.

Hall was educated at Queen Elizabeth's Grammar School, Blackburn and St John's College, Cambridge. Ordained in 1956 he began his ministry as a curate at St Martin's, Birmingham after which he was the Rector of Avondale, Harare and then St Martin in the Bull Ring, Birmingham before his ordination to the episcopate.  A keen mountain walker, he was married with two sons and in retirement continued to serve the church as an honorary assistant bishop in the Diocese of Birmingham.

References

1930 births

2013 deaths

Alumni of St John's College, Cambridge

Bishops of Woolwich
20th-century Church of England bishops
People educated at Queen Elizabeth's Grammar School, Blackburn